Andreas Gerster (born 24 November 1982) is a former international footballer from Liechtenstein who played as a midfielder. Gerster last played club football for FC Triesenberg, and formerly played for FC Vaduz, TSV Hartberg and USV Eschen/Mauren.

External links
 

1982 births
Living people
Liechtenstein footballers
Liechtenstein international footballers
FC Vaduz players
FC Triesenberg players
Association football midfielders